Emmanuel Eugene Paul Édouard Vidart (9 April 1882 – 13 January 1944) was a French equestrian. He competed in the individual eventing event at the 1920 Summer Olympics. He died on active service during World War II.

References

External links
 

1882 births
1944 deaths
French male equestrians
Olympic equestrians of France
Equestrians at the 1920 Summer Olympics
Place of birth missing
French military personnel killed in World War II
Sportspeople from Ain
Free French military personnel of World War II